This is a list of the fastest flying birds in the world. A bird's velocity is necessarily variable; a hunting bird will reach much greater speeds while diving to catch prey than when flying horizontally. The bird that can achieve the greatest airspeed is the peregrine falcon, able to exceed  in its dives. This record remains unconfirmed as the measurement methods have never been published or verified. The record for the fastest confirmed level flight by a bird is  held by the common swift.

Birds by flying speed

See also
 List of birds by flight heights

Note

References

External links

The world's fastest birds The Travel Almanac
What Are The Fastest Flying Birds? Blur it

 
Flight
Flight speed